Andrey Pavlovich Markov (born 30 June 1972) is a Russian politician. He has represented the Anna constituency for the United Russia party since 2021.

See also 

 List of members of the 8th Russian State Duma

References 

Living people
1972 births
People from Voronezh Oblast
United Russia politicians
Eighth convocation members of the State Duma (Russian Federation)
21st-century Russian politicians

Voronezh State University alumni